The 2019 Mid-American Conference football season was the 74th season for the Mid-American Conference (MAC). and is part of the 2019 NCAA Division I FBS football season. The season will begin on August 29 and will end on November 30. The entire schedule was released on February 20, 2019. The MAC Championship Game will be held on December 7, 2019.

Previous season
 in 2018, Northern Illinois won the West Division with a 6–2 Conference record while the Buffalo won the East Division with a 7–1 Conference record. Northern Illinois defeated Buffalo in the MAC Championship Game.

Preseason

Preseason Poll
The MAC Preseason Poll will be released at the MAC Media Day On July 23, 2019 in Detroit, Michigan.

East 

Ohio (24), 144 points
Miami 107 points
Buffalo 100 points 
Kent State 62 points
Akron 54 points
Bowling Green 37 points

West 

Toledo (15), 127 points 
Western Michigan (5), 112 points
Northern Illinois (3), 103 points  
Eastern Michigan 83 points 
Ball State 43 points
Central Michigan (1), 36 points

(first place votes)

MAC Championship 
Ohio received 13 votes as the predicted 2019 MAC Championship Game winner. Toledo (7); Western Michigan (2); Northern Illinois (1) and Central Michigan (1) also received votes.

Head coaches

Coaching changes
There will be three new head coaches in MAC for the 2019 season.

Mike Jinks was fired and replaced by Scot Loeffler at Bowling Green.

John Bonamego was fired and replaced by Jim McElwain at Central Michigan.

Rod Carey left Northern Illinois for Temple and was replaced by Thomas Hammock.

Coaches

Schedule

Regular season 
The Regular season will begin on August 29 and will end on November 30

Week One

Week Two

Week Three

Week Four

Week Five

Week Six

Week Seven

Week Eight

Week Nine

Week Ten

Week Eleven

Week Twelve

Week Thirteen

Week Fourteen

Championship Game

Week Fifteen (MAC Championship game)

Mid-American vs other conferences
2019–2020 records against non-conference foes:

Regular Season

Post Season

Mid-American vs Power 5 matchups
This is a list of games the MAC has scheduled versus power conference teams (ACC, Big 10, Big 12, Pac-12, BYU, Notre Dame and SEC). All rankings are from the current AP Poll at the time of the game.

Mid-American vs Group of Five matchups
The following games include MAC teams competing against teams from the American, C-USA, Mountain or Sun Belt.

Mid-American vs FBS independents matchups
The following games include MAC  teams competing against FBS Independents, which includes Army, Liberty, New Mexico State, or UMass.

Mid-American vs FCS matchups

Postseason

Bowl games

Rankings are from CFP rankings. All times Eastern Time Zone. MAC teams shown in bold.

Selection of teams
Bowl eligible:  Buffalo, Central Michigan, Eastern Michigan, Kent State, Miami, Ohio, Western Michigan, Toledo
Bowl-ineligible: Akron, Bowling Green, Ball State, Northern Illinois

Awards and honors

Player of the week honors

East Division

West Division

MAC Individual Awards
The following individuals received postseason honors as voted by the Mid-American Conference football coaches at the end of the season

All-conference teams

*Denotes Unanimous Selection

Ref:

All Conference Honorable Mentions:

All-Americans

The 2019 College Football All-America Teams are composed of the following College Football All-American first teams chosen by the following selector organizations: Associated Press (AP), Football Writers Association of America (FWAA), American Football Coaches Association (AFCA), Walter Camp Foundation (WCFF), The Sporting News (TSN), Sports Illustrated (SI), USA Today (USAT) ESPN, CBS Sports (CBS), FOX Sports (FOX) College Football News (CFN), Bleacher Report (BR), Scout.com, Phil Steele (PS), SB Nation (SB), Athlon Sports, Pro Football Focus (PFF) and Yahoo! Sports (Yahoo!).

Currently, the NCAA compiles consensus all-America teams in the sports of Division I-FBS football and Division I men's basketball using a point system computed from All-America teams named by coaches associations or media sources.  The system consists of three points for a first-team honor, two points for second-team honor, and one point for third-team honor.  Honorable mention and fourth team or lower recognitions are not accorded any points.  Football consensus teams are compiled by position and the player accumulating the most points at each position is named first team consensus all-American.  Currently, the NCAA recognizes All-Americans selected by the AP, AFCA, FWAA, TSN, and the WCFF to determine Consensus and Unanimous All-Americans. Any player named to the First Team by all five of the NCAA-recognized selectors is deemed a Unanimous All-American.

*AFCA All-America Team
*AP All-America teams
*CBS Sports All-America Team
*ESPN All-America Team
*FWAA All-America Team
*Sports Illustrated All-America Team
*The Athletic All-America Team
*USA Today All-America Team
*Walter Camp All-America Team
*Sporting News All-America Team

All-Academic

National award winners 
2019 College Football Award Winners

Home game attendance

Bold – Exceed capacity
†Season High

NFL Draft
The following list includes all MAC players who were drafted in the 2020 NFL draft.

References